Anders Lars-Göran "Lakke" Magnusson (21 May 1946, in Kinna, Västergötland – 19 February 2004, in Stockholm) was a Swedish actor, best known as Kurt in Håkan Bråkan.

Selected filmography
2004 - Kyrkogårdsön
2003 - Håkan Bråkan (TV)
2003 - Illusive Tracks
2000 - Skärgårdsdoktorn (TV)
2000 - Ronny & Julia (TV)
1999 - Sally (TV)
1997 - Kenny Starfighter (TV)
1997 - Peter-No-Tail (TV, julkalendern)
1997 - Jag är din krigare
1996 - Kalle Blomkvist – Mästerdetektiven lever farligt
1995 - Anmäld försvunnen (TV)
1995 - Vita lögner (TV)
1994 - Sommarmord
1994 - Den vite riddaren (TV)

References

Swedish male actors
1946 births
2004 deaths